Marko Knežević (born 29 March 1989) is a Serbian professional footballer, playing as a goalkeeper for Železničar Pančevo.

Knežević is a product of Partizan's youth system, but failed to make a single appearance for the club. He instead went on loan to Teleoptik and Metalac Gornji Milanovac.

Knežević represented Serbia and Montenegro at the 2006 UEFA Under-17 Championship.

Honours
Borac Banja Luka
 Bosnia and Herzegovina Cup: 2009–10

Notes & references

External links
 
 

Serbian footballers
Association football goalkeepers
Expatriate footballers in Bosnia and Herzegovina
FK Banat Zrenjanin players
FK Bežanija players
FK Borac Banja Luka players
FK Javor Ivanjica players
FK Kolubara players
FK Metalac Gornji Milanovac players
FK Partizan players
FK Radnički 1923 players
FK Smederevo players
FK Teleoptik players
FK Voždovac players
FK Radnički Niš players
FK Inđija players
FK Železničar Pančevo players
Footballers from Belgrade
Premier League of Bosnia and Herzegovina players
Serbia youth international footballers
Serbian expatriate footballers
Serbian expatriate sportspeople in Bosnia and Herzegovina
Serbian First League players
Serbian SuperLiga players
1989 births
Living people